Reo Sano (佐野 玲於 Sano Reo, born 8 January 1996) is a Japanese dancer and actor. He is one of the performers and the youngest member of the Japanese all-male dance and music group Generations from Exile Tribe.

Career 
In 2006, Sano started attending Tokyo's EXPG (Exile professional Gym) where he has practiced  KRUMP dance.

In April 2011, he was selected as a candidate of Generations through an audition held in EXPG and in April 2012 he became an official member.

In March 2014, he participated in Exile Performer Battle Audition and made it to the finals but wasn't selected to join Exile.

In July 2014 he made his acting debut with drama GTO.

He is member of the Krump group Twiggz Fam and also of Rag Pound.

In July 2018, he made his first lead role in the movie "Rainbow Days".

Works

Choreography

Filmography

TV Dramas 

 无序列表项

Movies

Short films

Stageplay

Game

TV Shows

Internet Shows

Advertisements

Music videos

Live

Voice acting

Photobook

References

External links 

 Official Website (in English)
 Official Twitter@sanoreofficial 
 Agency profile (in Japanese)
 Generations profile (in English)
 Generations profile (in Japanese)

Japanese male dancers
Living people
Musicians from Tokyo
LDH (company) artists
21st-century Japanese male actors
1996 births
21st-century dancers